The 1903 Stetson Hatters football team represented the private Stetson College in the sport of American football during the 1903 college football season. The team claimed a state title. The tie with Florida State prevented State from receiving the Times-Union Cup.

Schedule

References

Stetson
Stetson Hatters football seasons
Stetson Hatters football